Nativity of the Lord Orthodox Cathedral of Shkodër is a modern orthodox cathedral in the city of Shkodër in northwestern Albania.

References

Cathedrals in Albania
Buildings and structures in Shkodër
Churches in Shkodër
Tourist attractions in Shkodër